The 1980 Metro Conference men's basketball tournament was held February 28–March 2 at Freedom Hall in Louisville, Kentucky. 

Top-seeded Louisville defeated Florida State in the championship game, 81–72, to win their second Metro men's basketball tournament.

The Cardinals, in turn, received an automatic bid to the 1980 NCAA Tournament, which they would go on to win. Fellow Metro Conference members Florida State and Virginia Tech also qualified for the NCAA field.

Format
All seven of the conference's members participated in the tournament field. They were seeded based on regular season conference records, with the top team earning a bye into the semifinal round. The other six teams entered into the preliminary first round.

Bracket

References

Metro Conference men's basketball tournament
Tournament
Metro Conference men's basketball tournament
Metro Conference men's basketball tournament
Metro Conference men's basketball tournament